The 2002–03 All-Ireland Senior Club Football Championship was the 33rd staging of the All-Ireland Senior Club Football Championship since its establishment by the Gaelic Athletic Association in 1970-71. The championship began on 27 October 2002 and ended on 17 March 2003.

Ballinderry entered the championship as the defending champions, however, they were beaten by Errigal Ciarán in the Ulster Club Championship.

On 17 March 2003, Nemo Rangers won the championship following a 0-14 to 1-09 defeat of Crossmolina Deel Rovers in the All-Ireland final at Croke Park. It was their seventh championship title overall and their first title since 1994.

Nemo's Colin Corkery was the championship's top scorer with 2-23.

Team changes

The Donegal club champions did not contest the Ulster Club Championship due to a series of disputes and a delay in the completion of the Donegal County Championship.

Results

Connacht Senior Club Football Championship

Quarter-final

Semi-finals

Final

Leinster Senior Club Football Championship

First round

Quarter-finals

Semi-finals

Final

Munster Senior Club Football Championship

Quarter-finals

Semi-finals

Final

Ulster Senior Club Football Championship

Quarter-finals

Semi-finals

Final

All-Ireland Senior Club Football Championship

Quarter-final

Semi-finals

Final

Championship statistics

Top scorers

Overall

In a single game

Miscellaneous

 Dunshaughlin won the Leinster Club Championship for the first time in their history.
 Nemo Rangers became the first team to win three successive Munster Club Championship titles.

References

2002 in Gaelic football
2003 in Gaelic football